Petrus Jacobus Vermeulen (born 3 March 1987) is a retired South African rugby union player. His regular playing position is full-back or centre. He most recently represented the Griquas in the Currie Cup and Vodacom Cup, having previously played for both Western Province and Boland.

References

External links

itsrugby.co.uk profile

1987 births
Living people
People from Emthanjeni Local Municipality
Afrikaner people
South African people of Dutch descent
South African rugby union players
Rugby union centres
Western Province (rugby union) players
Griquas (rugby union) players
Boland Cavaliers players
Rugby union fullbacks
Rugby union players from the Northern Cape